Plum Orchard Lake is a  reservoir in the Plum Orchard Wildlife Management Area in Fayette County, West Virginia. The reservoir is the result of an impoundment on Plum Orchard Creek.

References

Bodies of water of Fayette County, West Virginia
Reservoirs in West Virginia